UVW may refer to:

 The CIE 1964 color space, often abbreviated as UVW
 , an umbrella organization for Dutch water boards
 United Vehicle Workers, a former trade union in Britain (1919 - 1922)
 United Voices of the World, an independent grassroots trade union in Britain
 , an Austrian academic publisher
 UVW mapping, a mathematical technique for coordinate mapping
 University of Virginia's College at Wise, a public liberal arts college in Wise, Virginia
 Unloaded Vehicle Weight, the weight of a vehicle as manufactured at the factory